Jorge Mariné (born 24 September 1941) is a Spanish former cyclist. He competed in the individual road race at the 1964 Summer Olympics.

References

External links
 

1941 births
Living people
Spanish male cyclists
Olympic cyclists of Spain
Cyclists at the 1964 Summer Olympics
People from Baix Camp
Sportspeople from the Province of Tarragona
Cyclists from Catalonia
20th-century Spanish people